Mahmoud Mohamed Shaker, Abu Fihr was an Egyptian writer, poet, journalist and scholar of the Arabic language and Islamic culture heritage.

Early life
Shaker was born on 1 February 1909 in Alexandria, and died on 7 August 1997 in Cairo.

Career
His thoughts and writings were based on the originality of the Arabic culture.  He wrote many books on Arabic language and culture including: A Message on The Way of Our Culture (Resala Fel Tarik Ela Thakafatena رسالة في الطريق إلى ثقافتنا), Al-Mutanabi المتنبي, Untruths and Tales (Abateel wa Asmaar أباطيل وأسمار), The Virgin Sagittarius ( Al-Qaws Al-AZraa القوس العذر. Most of his articles, which were published in different journals and magazines, were collected by professor Adel Solaiman Gamal in one book of 2 volumes titled: Jamharat Al-Maqalaat جمهرة المقالات .

See also 
 Ahmed Mohamed Shaker

1909 births
1997 deaths
Egyptian journalists
Egyptian male poets
Muslim writers
20th-century Egyptian poets
20th-century Egyptian historians
20th-century male writers
People from Alexandria
20th-century journalists